Plateremaeidae is a family of oribatids in the order Sarcoptiformes. There are about 7 genera and 19 described species in Plateremaeidae.

Genera
These seven genera belong to the family Plateremaeidae.
 Allodamaeus Banks, 1947
 Balogheremaeus Arillo & Subías, 2006
 Calipteremaeus Paschoal, 1987
 Lopheremaeus Paschoal, 1988
 Paralopheremaeus Paschoal, 1987
 Pedrocortesia
 Plateremaeus Berlese, 1908

References

Further reading

 
 
 
 
 
 

Acariformes
Acari families